Achatina craveni is a species of air-breathing land snail, a terrestrial pulmonate gastropod mollusk in the family Achatinidae, the giant African snails.

Distribution
Distribution of Achatina craveni includes "between Zanzibar and Lake Tanganyika".

Achatina cf. craveni has been reported also from Mozambique by van Bruggen (2010).

References

Achatinidae
Molluscs of Africa
Gastropods described in 1881